Reign Forever World is an EP by the Polish death metal band Vader. It was released on 16 December 2000 in Japan by Avalon Marquee, in Europe and Poland the EP was released via Metal Mind and Metal Blade on 22 January 2001.

Reign Forever World was recorded, and mixed in August 2000 at Red Studio in Gdynia with Piotr Łukaszewski as audio engineer. The album was mastered in September 2000 by Bartłomiej Kuźniak at Studio 333 in Częstochowa. Live tracks were recorded in August 2000 at Thrash'em All Festival in Olsztyn.

Track listing

Personnel
Production and performance credits are adapted from the album liner notes.

Vader
 Piotr "Peter" Wiwczarek – guitars, bass guitar, lead vocals, producer
 Maurycy "Mauser" Stefanowicz – guitars
 Leszek "Shambo" Rakowski – bass guitar (live recordings only)
 Krzysztof "Doc" Raczkowski – drums 

Note
 Recorded & mixed at Red Studio, Gdynia, August 2000. 
 Live tracks were recorded: Thrash'em All Festival, Olsztyn, August 2000. 
 Mastered at Studio 333, Częstochowa, September 2000 

Production
 Jacek Wiśniewski – cover art, and design
 Piotr Łukaszewski – sound engineering 
 Mariusz Kmiolek – management 
 Bartek Kuźniak – mastering 
 Massive Management – band photos
 Takahisa Okuno – Japanese liner notes

Charts

Weekly

Monthly

Release history

References 

2000 EPs
Vader (band) albums
Metal Mind Productions albums
Metal Blade Records albums